Al Saidiya is a street in Old Muscat, Oman. The street is 5.05 km long.

Nearby places and buildings
This is a list of popular places that lie on Al Saidiya Street.

Palaces
 Al Alam Palace

Government buildings
 Majlis- al Shura building

Museums
 Bait al Zubair

References

External links
 Beautiful Park at Al Saidiya Street, Old Muscat Oman video from YouTube

Tourist attractions in Muscat, Oman
Roads in Muscat, Oman
Old Muscat